Flight 243 may represent:

 Aloha Airlines Flight 243, explosive decompression on 28 April 1988
 Windjet Flight 243, landed short of runway on 24 September 2010
 RusAir Flight 243, crashed on 20 June 2011]

See also
 No. 243 Squadron RAF, which may be incorrectly called a "flight" instead of a "squadron"

0243